The international activities of Al-Qaeda includes involvements in Europe, where members of the group have been involved in militant and terrorist activities in several countries. Al-Qaeda has been responsible for or involved in attacks in Western Europe and Russia, including the 2004 Madrid train bombings, 2010 Moscow Metro bombings, 2011 Domodedovo International Airport bombing, and the January 2015 Île-de-France attacks.

Eastern Europe

North Caucasus

Al-Qaeda linked militants organized around the Caucasus Emirate have been involved in the Second Chechen War and the Insurgency in the North Caucasus. In August 2009 it was reported that during a raid the Russian police had killed an Algerian-born militant in Dagestan who according to the Federal Security Service, was "the Al-Qaeda co-ordinator in Dagestan". The militant was an Algerian national known as "Doctor Mohammed" and was thought to be a member of the 'Jamaat Shariat of Dagestan'

In 2010, Russian police shot and killed a militant in the Russian republic of Dagestan. The man was later determined to be one of the co-founders of the North Caucasus branch of al-Qaeda. The man's name was Mohamed Shaaban.

Northern Europe

Sweden
On 11 December 2010, a man linked to Al-Qaeda exploded a car bomb and a suicide bomb in Stockholm, killing only himself and injuring two others. Firefighters reported that the car had a gas cylinder, resulting in further explosions. He was later revealed to be Taimour Abdulwahab al-Abdaly, an Iraqi man, who was born in Baghdad and was granted Swedish citizenship in 1992. Before the attacks, he sent an email threat to TT referring to Sweden's involvement in the War in Afghanistan and Swedish artist Lars Vilks' drawings of Muhammad as a roundabout dog.

United Kingdom
In 2003 Tony Blair sent armoured vehicles and hundreds of troops to London Heathrow Airport because the UK security services claimed there was a planned Al-Qaeda attack. MI5 said they received detailed intelligence in February 2003 about a plot to hijack planes flying from Eastern Europe and to fly them into Heathrow, to punish the United Kingdom for supporting the Iraq War.

The men behind the 2006 transatlantic aircraft plot reportedly had links to al-Qaeda. MI5, Britain's secret service, accused the militant Islamic organisation of committing the attack. Osama bin Laden also made a video of the suicide bombing. U.S. Department of Homeland Security (DHS) Secretary Chertoff was clearly accusing al-Qaeda. In September 2009, Tanvir Hussain, Assad Sarwar and Ahmed Abdullah Ali were convicted of conspiring to activate bombs disguised as drinks on aircraft leaving from London and going to North America. British and US security officials said the plan – unlike many recent homegrown European terrorist plots – was directly linked to al-Qaeda and guided by senior Islamist militants in Pakistan.

Southern Europe

Bosnian War

During the Bosnian War in the early 1990s, al-Qaeda is considered to have been involved with organising volunteers for the Bosnian mujahideen. Al-Qaeda leaders including Osama Bin Laden and Ayman al-Zawahiri are thought to have visited camps in Bosnia during the war. The volunteer mujahideen from all over the world flocked there, including France, Indonesia, Iraq, Malaysia, Morocco, Russia, Saudi Arabia, Spain, Thailand, the United Kingdom, the United States and Yemen.

Italy
In May 2009 two French nationals were detained by Italian police due to suspected immigration offences however they are now suspected of being key Al-Qaeda figures. It is thought that they had planned to attack Charles de Gaulle airport in Paris, France. Italian police stated that they are "two leading men for the communication of al-Qaeda in Europe".

In 2012, a pentito of the Camorra stated that, the criminal organisation was in contact with members of Al-Qaeda and aware of incoming terrorist attacks. The organisation was informed that "something involving airplanes would have happened" and that Al-Qaeda was planning a train bombing in Spain.

In 2015, the Vatican was listed as a possible target for an attack by people associated with al-Qaeda.

Kosovo War 
Islamist elements in the Kosovo Liberation Army during the Kosovo War from Western Europe of ethnic Albanian, Turkish, and North African origin, were organised by Islamic leaders in Western Europe allied to Bin Laden and Zawahiri.

SHISH's head Fatos Klosi had said that Osama was running a terror network in Albania to take part in the war under the disguise of a humanitarian organisation reportedly started in 1994. Claude Kader who was a member testified its existence during his trial. In 2001, the official Belgrade news agency, Tanjug, reported that the "terrorist and fanatical Islamist" Osama Bin Laden, had come from Albania to use his armer forces of 500 Islamic militants in Kosovo around Korce and Pogradec to "commit terrorist acts."

Spain

The 11 March 2004 train bombings in Madrid killed 191 people and wounded more than 2,000. The terror cell had links to Al-Qaeda and the affiliated Moroccan Islamic Combatant Group (GICM). It was the violent start of the new Al-Qaeda. The new Islamic terrorist organization was already made up of jihadist organisations dependent on Osama Bin Laden, who made their own decisions. It was the worst Islamist attack in European history. On 2 August 2012 three members of Al-Qaeda were arrested in Ciudad Real and Cadiz, suspected of planning attacks in Spain and other European countries. There was an intended attempt at a mall in Cadiz with teleridigidas aircraft loaded with explosives. At the time of the arrest of one of the jihadists who opposed a "huge resistance, using their military training" were eliminated by the police.

Western Europe
A Europe-wide terror plot against the 1998 FIFA World Cup had the backing of bin Laden and Al-Qaeda. Preparations for an act of terrorism against the 1998 FIFA World Cup in France were completed by European law enforcement agencies between March and May 1998. The assassination was orchestrated by the Algerian Armed Islamic Group (GIA) along with Al-Qaeda leader Osama bin Laden. More than 100 people had been arrested in seven countries as a result of the investigation.

In December 2000, the "Frankfurt Group", an Al-Qaeda cell consisting of more than ten terrorists from Germany, France and the United Kingdom led by bin Laden deputy Mohammed Bensakhria was rounded up by law enforcement. The group had planned to bomb the Strasbourg Cathedral on New Year's Eve.

France
In October 2009 a physicist of Algerian descent working for CERN was arrested due to his links with Al-Qaeda. Officials said he had been in contact with people linked to Al-Qaeda in the Islamic Maghreb and planned attacks. He later admitted to corresponding with Al-Qaeda members located in North Africa over the Internet.

In January 2015, Al-Qaeda in the Arabian Peninsula was responsible for coordinated attacks in Paris, including the Charlie Hebdo shooting, killing several people.

Germany
In September 2009 security measures were heightened in response to a direct threat against Germany, through an Al-Qaeda video, the threat came about due to German participation in the Afghanistan war Osama Bin Laden stated:

External links 
 Foiled Plot Offers Clues to Recent Absence of Major Terror Attacks on West, Wednesday, 9 Sept. 2009 
  Al-Qaida's jihad in Europe: the Afghan-Bosnian network By Evan Kohlmann

Further reading
 Al Qaeda in Europe: The New Battleground of International Jihad, by Steven Emerson (Foreword), Lorenzo Vidino (Author). .
 Al-Qaida's Jihad in Europe: The Afghan-Bosnian Network, by Evan F. Kohlmann. .

References

Al-Qaeda activities
Islamic terrorism in Europe